The 1915 Chicago White Sox season involved the White Sox finishing third in the American League.

With the acquisitions of Eddie Collins (over the winter) and Joe Jackson (in August), Chicago now had the two hitters they needed to win the 1917 and 1919 AL pennants.

Offseason 
 December 8, 1914: Eddie Collins was purchased by the White Sox from the Philadelphia Athletics.

Regular season

Season standings

Record vs. opponents

Roster

Player stats

Batting

Starters by position 
Note: Pos = Position; G = Games played; AB = At bats; H = Hits; Avg. = Batting average; HR = Home runs; RBI = Runs batted in

Other batters 
Note: G = Games played; AB = At bats; H = Hits; Avg. = Batting average; HR = Home runs; RBI = Runs batted in

Pitching

Starting pitchers 
Note: G = Games pitched; IP = Innings pitched; W = Wins; L = Losses; ERA = Earned run average; SO = Strikeouts

Other pitchers 
Note: G = Games pitched; IP = Innings pitched; W = Wins; L = Losses; ERA = Earned run average; SO = Strikeouts

Relief pitchers 
Note: G = Games pitched; W = Wins; L = Losses; SV = Saves; ERA = Earned run average; SO = Strikeouts

Awards and honors

League top five finishers 
Eddie Collins
 #2 in AL in batting average (.332)
 #2 in AL in on-base percentage (.460)
 #2 in AL in runs scored (118)
 #3 in AL in stolen bases (46)
 #4 in AL in RBI (85)

Red Faber
 #2 in AL in wins (24)
 #2 in AL in strikeouts (182)

Jack Fournier
 AL leader in slugging percentage (.491)
 #3 in AL in batting average (.322)
 #3 in AL in on-base percentage (.429)

Jim Scott
 #2 in AL in wins (24)
 #4 in AL in ERA (2.03)

Notes

References 
1915 Chicago White Sox at Baseball Reference

Chicago White Sox seasons
Chicago White Sox season
Chicago White